Efraín Escudero (born January 15, 1986) is a Mexican mixed martial artist. He trains under Drew Fickett and competes in the 155 lb (70.3 kg) weight class. Efrain was the winner of season eight of Spike TV's reality show The Ultimate Fighter.

Mixed martial arts career

Early career
Escudero began his career in the summer of 2006 by putting together two back to back wins in Roland Sarria's Phoenix based Rage in the Cage mixed martial arts organization. He followed up his two fight win streak the following summer by recording 7 straight wins, all by submission. This streak of submissions was the highest recorded in the year of 2007.

Escudero only fought during the summer months because he was a full-time collegiate wrestler. He competed for Pima Community College for the 2006 and 2007 seasons. While competing Efrain found himself teammates with future UFC fighters Drew Fickett, Jamie Varner, Jesse Forbes, Anthony Birchak, George Roop, Anthony Leone, and Danny Martinez. During the 2006-2007 season, Escudero placed 7th at the NJCAA national tournament in the 157 lb weight class, officially making Escudero an All-American.

In 2007 Escudero stepped out of his summer fight schedule to compete in Full Moon Fighting's inaugural event held in Puerto Peñasco, Mexico. This was Escudero's first fight in his birth country of Mexico and he wore a pair of fight shorts bearing the Mexican Flag. This bout was against Tommy Wagner, whom he defeated by submission due to strikes at 1:12 of round 1.

The Ultimate Fighter 8
Escudero was a contestant on the UFC's The Ultimate Fighter: Team Nogueira vs. Team Mir on Spike TV as a lightweight. He won his first fight against Ido Pariente with a rear naked choke in the first round to make it into the house. He then beat Shane Nelson in the second round with a mounted triangle to earn a spot in the semi-finals. He then beat Junie Browning with a D'Arce choke in the second round to advance to the finals. In the show's finale, shown on Spike TV, Escudero earned a six-figure UFC contract by defeating Phillipe Nover by unanimous decision. Upon receiving the trophy, Escudero dedicated his win to his late father, who died just before he left for the show. He further dedicated his win to anybody who had ever lost anybody they loved.

Ultimate Fighting Championship
Escudero earned his first official win in the UFC on December 13, 2008, by defeating Phillipe Nover by unanimous decision during the main event of The Ultimate Fighter: Team Nogueira vs. Team Mir.

Efrain was set to fight Jeremy Stephens at UFC Fight Night 18. Efrain came down with a rib injury that forced him to withdraw from the bout. In an online interview, hosted by Escudero's official website, Escudero confirmed that he would fight Cole Miller at UFC 103. Prior to his fight with Miller, Efrain told FightLockdown.com, "I have been concentrating on knocking people out. My hands are improving every day. If they want to keep it standing, I am ready and willing to do just that.”

At UFC 103, in his first post-TUF fight, Escudero eventually earned an impressive KO win over Miller at 3:36 of the first round. He was aggressive throughout, once executing a powerful takedown in lifting and slamming Miller to the canvas. After dropping Miller with a strong jab, he followed up with two ground and pound strikes to the head of his opponent to stop the fight.

Escudero suffered his first professional defeat against Evan Dunham at UFC Fight Night 20 via submission in the third round. Escudero refused to tap until the armbar was at an extreme angle and left the ring under medical supervision before the victory presentation, leading to speculation that the arm was broken. Escudero reassured fans via Twitter that the arm only suffered tendon damage.

After an MRI showed that Efrain's arm was healthy, and he confirmed that he would be fighting Dan Lauzon at UFC 114.

Escudero then defeated Lauzon via unanimous decision (29-27, 29-27, 29-27) after being deducted a point late in the third round for accidentally striking Lauzon in the groin.

Escudero was expected to face John Gunderson on September 15, 2010, at UFC Fight Night 22. Escudero was then set to face Matt Wiman after Wiman's original opponent, Mac Danzig was forced from the card with an injury.  Wiman also suffered an injury and was replaced by Charles Oliveira.

Escudero weighed in at 159 pounds, three pounds over the limit, resulting in the fight becoming a catchweight bout.  Escudero lost the bout via submission due to a standing rear-naked choke in the third round.

On September 20, 2010, Escudero was released from his UFC contract, making him the second TUF winner to be released by the UFC.

Independent Promotions
After leaving the UFC, Escudero compiled a 5–1 record, finishing three of his opponents via submission.

Escudero's fourth fight since leaving the UFC came against fellow UFC veteran Fabrício Camões at Tachi Palace Fights 9 on May 5. He lost via unanimous decision after being controlled by Camões for the first two rounds.

Escudero was then scheduled to fight submission wizard Tim Radcliffe at BAMMA 7.  However, on September 6, it was announced that visa issues prevented his travel to England.

After visa-issues forced Paul Kelly out of his fight at Legacy Fighting Championship 9, Efrain was announced as his replacement. He was signed to fight Jeff Rexroad on Dec. 16th, 2011. However, Efrain was re-signed to the UFC, causing him to withdraw from the bout.

Escudero faced Tyson Griffin at Resurrection Fighting Alliance 4 on November 2, 2012. Escudero lost via unanimous decision.

Escudero faced Bellator vet Luis Palomino at CFA 12 on October 12, 2013  Escudero won via unanimous decision.

Return to the UFC
In his UFC return, Escudero faced Jacob Volkmann on December 30, 2011, at UFC 141, replacing an injured T. J. Grant.  He lost the fight via unanimous decision, but was very close to submitting Volkmann in the closing minutes.

Escudero then faced Mac Danzig on April 21, 2012, at UFC 145. Escudero lost the fight by unanimous decision and was subsequently released from the promotion for a second time.

Bellator MMA
Efrain signed a one-fight deal with Bellator Fighting Championships and fought Cesar Avila at Bellator 55. He won the fight by guillotine choke submission in the first round.

Escudero faced Zack Surdyka on September 20, 2013, at Bellator 100. He won the bout via unanimous decision.

Third UFC stint
Escudero was originally expected to face Francisco Trinaldo on September 13, 2014, at UFC Fight Night 51.  However, Trinaldo was replaced in the bout by Leonardo Santos. Escudero lost the fight by unanimous decision.

Escudero faced Rodrigo de Lima on February 14, 2015, at UFC Fight Night 60. He won the fight by unanimous decision.

Escudero then faced Drew Dober at UFC 188 on June 13, 2015.  He won the fight by guillotine choke submission in the first round.

Escudero faced Leandro Silva on November 21, 2015, at The Ultimate Fighter Latin America 2 Finale. He lost the fight by unanimous decision.

Escudero next faced Kevin Lee on April 23, 2016, at UFC 197. Despite Rocking Lee several times, and getting the better of the striking exchanges in each round, Efrain gave up several crucial take downs to Lee causing him to lose the fight by unanimous decision. Escudero was subsequently released from the promotion for a third time.

World Tour

Following his third release from the UFC, Escudero began competing in various international promotions. Recording decision victories in Urayasu, Chiba and Mons, Belgium.

Efrain was scheduled to compete at the O2 Arena in Prague, Czech Republic against  Mansour Barnaoui (13-4) on February, 7th 2017 for EuroFC's inaugural event but the event was cancelled. The bout with Mansour was to be rescheduled to a future event, but Mansour refused for unknown reasons. Efrain instead fought against Akhmet Aliev for Fight Nights Global 59 on February 23, 2017, in Khimki, Russia. Despite almost submitting Aliev in the first round, Escudero lost a unanimous decision. When Escudero returned to the United States he quickly accepted a short notice fight against former Bellator title challenger and fellow Ultimate Fighter alumnus Fabrício Guerreiro. Escudero won the fight via unanimous decision on March 18, 2017.

Efrain was scheduled to face Bellator veteran Murad Machaev in Yekaterinburg, Russia on May 25, 2017, for Fight Nights Global 66, however, Machaev pulled out of the bout for unknown reasons. Efrain faced Akhmed Aliev on February 23, 2017, at Fight Nights Global 59 and lost that fight by split decision.

Efrain decided to give himself a quick turnaround by helping fund, and run an upstart MMA promotion based out of Mexico called Lux Fight League. On July 21, 2017, Efrain competed in the main event of the inaugural event, defeating Ultimate Fighter Brazil veteran Bruno Murata by unanimous decision, handing Murata his first professional loss in the process. Following the win Efrain began a Twitter campaign to earn a spot on the Bellator Roster.

Absolute Championship Berkut

Escudero faced Musa Khamanaev on November 18, 2017, at ACB 74. He lost the fight via unanimous decision.

Escudero was scheduled to fight Rasul Shovhalov on January 27, 2018, at ACB 79, but the fight was cancelled.

Escudero was scheduled to face Khamzat Aushev on March 24, 2018, at ACB 83, but yet again his bout was cancelled.

Other promotions
Escudero returned to fight in his own Mexican MMA promotion, Lux Fight, League on February 17, 2018, scoring a first-round submission victory by choke over Jorge López Bustamante.

Professional Fighters League
Escudero faced Jason High in a lightweight tournament bout at PFL 2 in Chicago on June 21, 2018. He won the fight via technical submission in the third round. The win was controversial as the referee stopped the bout when High quickly moved his hand under Escudero's body, resulting in the referee believing it was a tap. However, upon review of replays, it was clear High had not tapped.

Escudero was set to face Islam Mamedov in the next round of the Lightweight tournament. However, Escudero missed the 156-pound weight limit by over seven pounds, and the bout set for the PFL 5 show on August 2, 2018, was cancelled. As a result, Mamedov was awarded 3 points via walkover victory.

Golden Boy Promotions
Escudero faced Gleison Tibau in a 160lbs catchweight bout at Golden Boy Promotions inaugural MMA event on November 24, 2018. He lost the bout via unanimous decision.

Personal life
Escudero was a collegiate wrestler at Grand Canyon University. Though he left the school to join the UFC, he eventually returned to earn his Bachelor of Science in Criminal Justice in 2011.

Efrain is father of two children; a daughter born in 2012, and a son born in 2016. Efrain currently resides in Phoenix, but also has a home in his hometown of Yuma, Arizona.

Championships and accomplishments
Superior Challenge
SC Lightweight Championship (One time, current)
Ultimate Fighting Championship
The Ultimate Fighter 8 Lightweight Winner

Mixed martial arts record

|-
|Win
|align=center|32–16
|Ricardo Chavez
|Decision (unanimous)
|Budo Sento Championship 11
|
|align=center|5
|align=center|5:00
|Mexico City, Mexico
|
|-
|Win
|align=center|31–16
|Leonard Smith
|Submission (heel hook)
|Fight Night Champions 5
|
|align=center|2
|align=center|4:22
| Tijuana, Mexico
|
|-
|Loss
|align=center|30–16
|Rasul Shovhalov
|Decision (unanimous)
|ACA 98: Khazhirokov vs. Henrique
|
|align=center|3
|align=center|5:00
|Krasnodar, Russia
|
|-
|Loss
|align=center|30–15
|Amirkhan Adaev
|Decision (split)
|ACA 92: Yagshimuradov vs. Celiński
|
|align=center|3
|align=center|5:00
|Warsaw, Poland
|
|-
| Loss 
| align=center|30–14
| Gleison Tibau
| Decision (unanimous)
| Golden Boy Promotions: Liddell vs. Ortiz 3
| 
| align=center| 3
| align=center| 5:00
| Inglewood, California, United States
| 
|-
|Win
|align=center|30–13
|Jason High
| Technical Submission (guillotine choke)
|PFL 2
|
|align=center| 3
|align=center| 0:35
|Chicago, Illinois, United States
|
|-
|Win
|align=center|29–13
|Jorge Lopez
| Submission (rear-naked choke)
|Lux Fight League - Lux 002
|
|align=center| 1
|align=center| 4:59
|Mexico City, Mexico
|
|-
|Loss
|align=center|28–13
|Musa Khamanaev
| Decision (unanimous)
|ACB 74: Aguev vs. Townsend
|
|align=center| 3
|align=center| 5:00
|Vienna, Austria
|
|-
|Win
|align=center|28–12
|Bruno Murata 
|Decision (unanimous)
|Lux Fight League - Tampico
|
|align=center|3
|align=center|5:00
|Tampico, Mexico
|
|-
|Win
|align=center|27–12
|Fabrício Guerreiro 
|Decision (unanimous)
|Conquer FC 3 
|
|align=center|3
|align=center|5:00
|Oakland, California, United States
|
|-
|Loss
|align=center|26–12
|Akhmet Aliev 
|Decision (split)
|Fight Nights Global 59: Minakov vs. Linderman
|
|align=center|3
|align=center|5:00
|Khimki, Russia
|
|-
|Win
|align=center|26–11
|Nelson Carvalho
|Decision (split)
|EBD - European Beatdown 1
|
|align=center|3
|align=center|5:00
|Mons, Belgium
|
|-
|Win
|align=center|25–11
|Koshi Matsumoto
|Decision (unanimous)
|Vale Tudo Japan - VTJ 8th
|
|align=center|3
|align=center|5:00
|Urayasu, Chiba, Japan
|
|-
|Loss
|align=center|24–11
|Kevin Lee
|Decision (unanimous)
|UFC 197
|
|align=center|3
|align=center|5:00
|Las Vegas, Nevada, United States
|
|-
| Loss
| align=center| 24–10
| Leandro Silva 
| Decision (unanimous)
| The Ultimate Fighter Latin America 2 Finale: Magny vs. Gastelum
| 
| align=center| 3
| align=center| 5:00
| Monterrey, Mexico
| 
|-
| Win
| align=center| 24–9
| Drew Dober
| Submission (guillotine choke)
| UFC 188
| 
| align=center| 1
| align=center| 0:54
| Mexico City, Mexico
| 
|-
| Win
| align=center| 23–9
| Rodrigo de Lima
| Decision (unanimous)
| UFC Fight Night: Henderson vs. Thatch
| 
| align=center| 3
| align=center| 5:00
| Broomfield, Colorado, United States
| 
|-
| Loss
| align=center| 22–9
| Leonardo Santos
| Decision (unanimous)
| UFC Fight Night: Bigfoot vs. Arlovski
| 
| align=center| 3
| align=center| 5:00
| Brasília, Brazil
| 
|-
| Win
| align=center| 22–8
| Juha-Pekka Vainikainen
| TKO (elbows and punches)
| Superior Challenge 10
| 
| align=center| 3
| align=center| 4:48
| Helsingborg, Sweden
| 
|-
| Loss
| align=center| 21–8
| Dakota Cochrane
| Decision (unanimous)
| RFA 13
| 
| align=center| 3
| align=center| 5:00
| Lincoln, Nebraska, United States
| 
|-
| Win
| align=center| 21–7
| Luis Palomino
| Decision (unanimous)
| CFA 12: Sampo vs. Thao
| 
| align=center| 3
| align=center| 5:00
| Coral Gables, Florida, United States
| 
|-
| Win
| align=center| 20–7
| Zack Surdyka
| Decision (unanimous)
| Bellator 100
| 
| align=center| 3
| align=center| 5:00
| Phoenix, Arizona, United States
| 
|-
| Win
| align=center| 19–7
| Marcus Edwards 
| Decision (split)
| Sparta Combat League: Live at the Stampede
| 
| align=center| 3
| align=center| 5:00
| Greeley, Colorado, United States
| 
|-
| Loss
| align=center| 18–7
| Jorge Patino
| Decision (split)
| Max Sport: 13.2
| 
| align=center| 3
| align=center| 5:00
| São Paulo, Brazil
| 
|-
| Loss
| align=center| 18–6
| Tyson Griffin
| Decision (unanimous)
| RFA 4
| 
| align=center| 3
| align=center| 5:00
| Las Vegas, Nevada, United States
| 
|-
| Loss
| align=center| 18–5
| Mac Danzig 
| Decision (unanimous)
| UFC 145
| 
| align=center| 3
| align=center| 5:00
| Atlanta, Georgia, United States
| 
|-
| Loss
| align=center| 18–4
| Jacob Volkmann 
| Decision (unanimous)
| UFC 141
| 
| align=center| 3
| align=center| 5:00
| Las Vegas, Nevada, United States
| 
|-
| Win
| align=center| 18–3
| Cesar Avila 
| Submission (guillotine choke)
| Bellator 55
| 
| align=center| 1
| align=center| 1:55
| Yuma, Arizona, United States
| 
|-
| Win
| align=center| 17–3
| Mike Rio
| Decision (unanimous)
| CFA 2: McCorkle vs. Hayes
| 
| align=center| 3
| align=center| 5:00
| Miami, Florida, United States
| 
|-
| Loss
| align=center| 16–3
| Fabrício Camões
| Decision (unanimous)
| TPF 9: The Contenders
| 
| align=center| 3
| align=center| 5:00
| Lemoore, California, United States
| 
|-
| Win
| align=center| 16–2
| Ashe Bowman
| Decision (unanimous)
| XCage: Predators
| 
| align=center| 3
| align=center| 5:00
| Tijuana, Mexico
| 
|-
| Win
| align=center| 15–2
| Jeremy Larsen
| Submission (armbar)
| Rage In The Cage 148
| 
| align=center| 3
| align=center| 3:21
| Chandler, Arizona, United States
| 
|-
| Win
| align=center| 14–2
| Alfredo Martinez
| Submission (rear-naked choke)
| Desert Rage Full Contact Fighting 8
| 
| align=center| 1
| align=center| 1:14
| Somerton, Arizona, United States
| 
|-
| Loss
| align=center| 13–2
| Charles Oliveira
| |Submission (rear-naked choke)
| UFC Fight Night: Marquardt vs. Palhares
| 
| align=center| 3
| align=center| 2:25
| Austin, Texas, United States
| 
|-
| Win
| align=center| 13–1
| Dan Lauzon
| Decision (unanimous)
| UFC 114
| 
| align=center| 3
| align=center| 5:00
| Las Vegas, Nevada, United States
| 
|-
| Loss
| align=center| 12–1
| Evan Dunham
| Submission (armbar)
| UFC Fight Night: Maynard vs. Diaz
| 
| align=center| 3
| align=center| 1:59
| Fairfax, Virginia, United States
| 
|-
| Win
| align=center| 12–0
| Cole Miller
| KO (punches)
| UFC 103
| 
| align=center| 1
| align=center| 3:36
| Dallas, Texas, United States
| 
|-
| Win
| align=center| 11–0
| Phillipe Nover
| Decision (unanimous)
| The Ultimate Fighter: Team Nogueira vs Team Mir Finale
| 
| align=center| 3
| align=center| 5:00
| Las Vegas, Nevada, United States
| 
|-
| Win
| align=center| 10–0
| Tommy Wagner
| Submission (punches)
| Full Moon Fighting
| 
| align=center| 1
| align=center| 1:12
| Puerto Peñasco, Mexico
| 
|-
| Win
| align=center| 9–0
| Eric Regan
| Submission (rear-naked choke)
| Rage in the Cage 99
| 
| align=center| 2
| align=center| 2:15
| Tucson, Arizona, United States
| 
|-
| Win
| align=center| 8–0
| Jon Kecks
| Submission (triangle choke)
| Cage Supremacy 2
| 
| align=center| 1
| align=center| 2:04
| Tucson, Arizona, United States
| 
|-
| Win
| align=center| 7–0
| TJ Zasa
| Submission (rear-naked choke)
| Cage Supremacy
| 
| align=center| 2
| align=center| 0:43
| Tucson, Arizona, United States
| 
|-
| Win
| align=center| 6–0
| Peter Newsheller
| Submission (rear-naked choke)
| Rage in the Cage 96
| 
| align=center| 1
| align=center| 1:13
| Tucson, Arizona, United States
| 
|-
| Win
| align=center| 5–0
| Jose Rodriguez
| Submission (triangle choke)
| Rage in the Cage 95
| 
| align=center| 1
| align=center| 2:29
| Fountain Hills, Arizona, United States
| 
|-
| Win
| align=center| 4–0
| Nic Stone
| Submission (armbar)
| Rage in the Cage 93
| 
| align=center| 2
| align=center| 1:25
| Somerton, Arizona, United States
| 
|-
| Win
| align=center| 3–0
| Mike Smith
| Submission (rear-naked choke)
| Rage in the Cage 92: Cronin vs Vigil
| 
| align=center| 1
| align=center| 2:57
| Phoenix, Arizona, United States
| 
|-
| Win
| align=center| 2–0
| Joe Cronin
| Decision (unanimous)
| Rage in the Cage 84: Celebrity Theatre
| 
| align=center| 3
| align=center| 3:00
| Phoenix, Arizona, United States
| 
|-
| Win
| align=center| 1–0
| Chris Collado
| Submission (choke)
| Rage in the Cage 83: Rampage
| 
| align=center| 1
| align=center| N/A
| Fountain Hills, Arizona, United States
|

See also
 List of Bellator MMA alumni
 List of male mixed martial artists

References

External links

The Ultimate Fighter winners
Living people
1986 births
Mexican male mixed martial artists
Lightweight mixed martial artists
Mixed martial artists utilizing collegiate wrestling
Mixed martial artists utilizing Brazilian jiu-jitsu
Mexican male sport wrestlers
Amateur wrestlers
Mexican practitioners of Brazilian jiu-jitsu
People from San Luis Río Colorado
Grand Canyon University alumni
Sportspeople from Sonora
Ultimate Fighting Championship male fighters